The South Dakota Coyotes women's basketball team represents the University of South Dakota in NCAA Division I basketball. They are currently members of the Summit League.

History
As of the end of the 2016–17 season, the Coyotes have a 741-517 all-time record, with play beginning in 1971. They won the North Central Conference title in 1983, 1984, 1985, and 2008, with regular season titles in 2003, and 2008; and a Summit League title in 2014, with regular season wins in 2015 and 2016. They won the Women's National Invitation Tournament (WNIT) title in 2016.

Postseason results

NCAA Division I tournament results
The Coyotes have appeared in four NCAA Tournaments. Their record is 2–4.

WNIT appearances
The Coyotes have appeared in five WNIT Tournaments. Their record is 12–4.

WBI appearances
The Coyotes have appeared in 2 WBI Tournaments. Their record is 3–2.

NCAA Division II tournament results
The Coyotes made eight appearances in the NCAA Division II women's basketball tournament. They had a combined record of 8–8.

References

External links